Chi Iota Pi Sorority, Inc. is a multicultural non-profit collegiate sorority founded on November 23, 2004, by 8 women from the University of Maryland whose ethnicities included Caucasian, Latina, and South Asian.  The sorority, although young in comparison to its other Greek counterparts, has expanded to several institutions and has reached a higher level of diversity through the addition of ethnic representation of African, African-American, East Asian, Caribbean, European, and Multiracial women. The organization focuses on empowering its sisters, campus communities, local communities, and larger communities through educational, advocacy, service, and social programming.

Mission statement
As stated on the Chi Iota Pi website: "The purpose of Chi Iota Pi is to establish a multifaceted sisterhood based on Compassion, Integrity and Perseverance. Chi Iota Pi will accomplish this through community service, educational and social programming that aims at empowering minorities, women, and children. It is the goal of Chi Iota Pi to strive for finer womanhood and foster the growth of diverse women of leadership to catalyze change in society."

Service & Philanthropy
Chi Iota Pi was incorporated in January 2005 as a service-based sorority. Since then service projects have mostly included participation with the ONE Campaign (founded the same year as CIP), World Children's Fund, and Feeding America.

Beyond this, Chapters have participated in other programs such as women empowerment programs, annual minority cancer awareness programs, and walked to fundraise for ALS, Diabetes, and Cancer.

Chapters
Α Chapter - University of Maryland, College Park
The University of Maryland is a school rich in Greek life. Although Chi Iota Pi makes up only a small percentage of the Greek student population, CIP was recognized in Spring 2010 by the Office of Fraternity and Sorority Life as having the best non-Greek program. Chi Iota Pi is a member of the United Greek Council at UMD and is also a MICA (Multicultural Involvement and Community Advocacy) Organization.

Β Colony - University of Connecticut
Γ Chapter - Trinity University (Washington, DC)
Gamma Chapter is the only non-historically Black sorority on Trinity's campus. Trinity University does not recognize Greek life on its campus because it is a Catholic Institution. Therefore, membership in CIP is open to undergraduates at local universities where Trinity is central to. Gamma Chapter has been in existence since 2006 and has done programming for the Torture Abolition and Survivors Support Coalition and the Capital Area Food Bank.

Δ Colony - University System of Georgia
Delta Colony has previously had membership at Dalton State College and Kennesaw University, but is open to women from any of Georgia's four-year colleges & universities. Notable programming includes fundraising for Oprah's Big Give and volunteering at Hamilton Health, a local hospital.

Ε Colony - Salisbury University
Epsilon Colony was the youngest of Chi Iota Pi, having been established in the Spring of 2009.  It was the only official multicultural sorority at the time at Salisbury University, but Epsilon extended its programming beyond the confines of the university and had done service at local food banks and in the community. However it is no longer active.

ΠΑ Chapter - DC Metro Area/Nationwide Alumnae Chapter
Pi Alpha Chapter provides networking and collaboration opportunities to Alumnae Sisters everywhere. Sisters range from the DC Metropolitan Area to New York, Florida, and Texas.  Pi Alpha works in partnership with other alumni Greeks and non-Greek organizations to further the mission of Chi Iota Pi.

References

External links 
 http://www.chi-iota-pi.org

Multiculturalism in the United States
Fraternities and sororities in the United States
Student organizations established in 2004
Women's organizations based in the United States
University of Maryland, College Park
Women in Maryland
2004 establishments in Maryland